Christophe Lallet (born 25 July 1986) is a professional Swedish football player who played as a midfielder.

Career
Lallet began his professional career with Väsby United in 2006, before continuing in Sweden with Degerfors IF and Hammarby IF.

Lallet signed for NASL club Tampa Bay Rowdies in January 2014. The Rowdies and Lallet mutually agreed to terminate his contract early in July 2014. In August Lallet signed for Ik Frej to then end his footballing career in 2016 to pursue his music passion. He released 8 songs 2015 to 2019. In 2021 Lallet started to coach FC Gute

Ahead of the 2022 season he was announced as head coach of FC Gute.

References

External links
Tampa Bay Rowdies bio
 

1986 births
Living people
Swedish footballers
AFC Eskilstuna players
Degerfors IF players
Hammarby Fotboll players
Tampa Bay Rowdies players
Association football midfielders
Superettan players
Ettan Fotboll players
North American Soccer League players
IK Frej players
Swedish expatriate footballers
Expatriate soccer players in the United States
Swedish expatriate sportspeople in the United States
Footballers from Stockholm